Terry Cafolla is a Northern Irish screenwriter.

Early life
Terry Cafolla was born in Armagh in 1969. He left Armagh to study at Queen's University, where he completed a degree in Philosophy and Russian studies before subsequently obtaining an MA in Poetry. After leaving college, following a short spell on a media-training course, Cafolla secured a one-year contract with a Belfast film collective. Cafolla himself cites the fact that both poetry and American TV drama had a large influence over him in his adolescence, despite the fact that "TV never seemed an option for somebody from Armagh".

Career
His first television drama Holy Cross (2003) examined the emotive events which occurred on Belfast’s Ardoyne Road in 2001 and signalled the emergence of a television writer of skill and sensitivity. This first foray into television drama earned Cafolla a BAFTA nomination for best new Drama, and a Golden FIPA award for best screenplay. Cafolla has since contributed to the TV drama Messiah and has written episodes for both series of Law & Order: UK, a British adaptation of the long-running US crime series. Other notable work includes a drama-documentary on the life of George Best, and an episode of the TV fantasy series, Camelot.

He wrote The Whale, a television film starring Martin Sheen that aired on BBC One in 2014. He wrote an episode of the historical drama Britannia in 2017.

References

External links

Living people
1969 births
British male screenwriters
British television writers
British male television writers
Television writers from Northern Ireland
Screenwriters from Northern Ireland
Male writers from Northern Ireland